SMOG was one of the earliest informal literary groups independent of the Soviet state in post-Stalin Soviet Union. Among several interpretations of the acronym are Smelsot', Mysl', Obraz i Glubina (Courage, Thought, Image and Depth), and, humorously, Samoe Molodoe Obshchestvo Geniev (Society of Youngest Geniuses).

It was organized in January/February 1965 by a group of young poets and writers: Poet Leonid Gubanov (initiator, membership card #1); writer and editor Vladimir Batshev (membership card #2); poet and publicist Yuri Kublanovsky; Vladimir Aleynikov, a poet who received the Andrei Belyi prize; and poets Nikolai Bokov and Arkady Pakhomov, later joined by several dozens of others.

The group held public poetry readings and issued several samizdat collections and a magazine, Sfinksy ("Sphynxes"). In 1965, they revived their literary meetings at Mayakovsky Square (Mayakovsky Square poetry readings).

Some members also helped organize the unsanctioned 1965 glasnost rally calling for a legal trial of writers Andrei Sinyavsky and Yuli Daniel.

The group was under pressure from the state. Its last poetry reading took place on April 14, 1966.

References

Bibliography

External links 
 

Arts organizations established in 1965
1965 establishments in the Soviet Union
1965 establishments in Russia
Organizations disestablished in 1966
1966 disestablishments in the Soviet Union
1966 disestablishments in Russia
Non-profit organizations based in the Soviet Union
Russian writers' organizations
Soviet culture
Soviet opposition groups
Russian literary societies
Underground culture